Zac Roper (born April 29, 1978) is an American football coach. He was most recently the tight ends coach, and was previously the offensive coordinator at Duke University. Prior to this, Roper had spent the majority of his career as a special teams coordinator. He worked with staffs at Ole Miss, Oklahoma, and Cornell before joining the Duke staff for the 2008 season.

Coaching career

Oklahoma
Roper started his college coaching career as a student assistant for the Oklahoma Sooners football team from 1996-1998, before transferring to Ole Miss.

Ole Miss
Roper served as a student assistant, an administrative graduate assistant, and a graduate assistant coach at Ole Miss from 2001 through 2004. Here, he first worked for current Duke head coach, David Cutcliffe. While working as a graduate assistant coach, Roper worked with the wide receivers, tight ends, and placekickers. In 2003, Jonathan Nichols won the Lou Groza Award as the nation’s top kicker.

Cornell
Following his time at Ole Miss, Roper joined the staff at Cornell as the special teams coordinator. In addition to special teams, Roper coached the running backs and tight ends in his first two seasons with the Big Red, 2005 and 2006. During his third and final year at Cornell, Roper switched to the defensive side of the ball, and coached the cornerbacks.

Duke
In 2008, Roper rejoined David Cutcliffe at Duke. He joined the staff as the special teams coordinator and running backs coach. 2008 was also the first year for Roper’s brother, Kurt Roper, serving as the offensive coordinator for the Blue Devils. In 2013, the staffed was restructured and Roper moved from coaching the running backs, to coaching the tight ends, while continuing his special teams duties.

When Scottie Montgomery left Duke to become the head coach at East Carolina prior to the 2016 season, Roper was promoted to offensive coordinator and took over coaching the quarterbacks.

Arguably his most notable play-call as offensive coordinator came in the 2019 game versus North Carolina. On 1st and Goal down 20-17 with 18 seconds to go in the game, Roper called for his runningback Deon Jackson to throw a "jump pass" rather than electing to run the ball or use his quarterback to pass it. The playcall resulted in an interception by Chazz Surratt, preventing the Blue Devils from kicking a field goal to send the game to overtime. After the 2019 season in which Duke's offense was second to last in the league with 329.7 yards per game, Cutcliffe took play-calling duties from Roper. Following another sub-par offensive season, and a 2-9 record in 2020, Roper lost his offensive coordinator title, and switched from coaching quarterbacks to tight ends.

Personal life
Roper and his wife, Rebecca (Harvey), have two children, Joshua and Mikayla. His father Bobby was a longtime college football assistant, who was most notably the defensive coordinator on the national champion 1976 University of Pittsburgh football team. His brother Kurt is currently the running backs coach at NC State.

References

External links
 Duke profile

1978 births
Living people
Cornell Big Red football coaches
Ole Miss Rebels football coaches
Duke Blue Devils football coaches
Oklahoma Sooners football coaches
Sportspeople from Knoxville, Tennessee